Mt Lyford (1590m) is the home of an alpine village and ski resort in the South Island of New Zealand. It is 146 kilometres by road north of Christchurch on the Inland Kaikōura Road (SH70) between Culverden and Kaikoura. The resort is a 40-minute drive to Hanmer Springs and a 45-minute drive to Kaikoura. The nearby township of Waiau, Canterbury has a small supermarket, DIY store and petrol station. The Inland Kaikōura Road is very scenic and windy from Waiau through to Kaikōura and forms part of the Alpine Pacific Touring Route.

In 1986 the Village and Ski field was developed by D & J Simpson, who formerly farmed this area. Recreational areas and artificial lakes were also planned and strict building codes were placed on the type of buildings and construction methods use within the subdivision. Originally only log chalets were allowed to be built with a minimum roof pitch of 45 degrees. In 2020 the rules were relaxed slightly but external wooden appearance is still required to protect the appearance of the village. 

In addition to the subdivision a commercial ski field and access road was developed in the overlooking mountains catering for families, including ice-skating, day shelter/cafeteria together with ski tows and car parking. Currently the Simpson family continues to operate Mt Lyford Alpine Resort ski field. Following a run of several years of disappointing snowfall the resort moved higher up the mountain and expanded. Its higher elevation makes snowfall more predictable and the ski resort now includes access to Mt Terako (1742 m) and caters for beginner, intermediate and advanced skiers and snowboarders. The runs cover an elevation range of 1249 m to 1740 m. There is one T-bar, one poma lift, two "platters", one rope tow, and one "advanced rope tow". Most trails are groomed and there is a snowboard board with half pipe and "fun box".

There are currently about 50 log houses through the native bush in the alpine village area at an elevation of between 500 m and 750 m above sea level. Some houses are inhabited permanently, whilst others are holiday homes. The village is surrounded by Beech, Manuka and Kanuka trees. Birdlife includes New Zealand Bellbird, Fantail, Waxeye/Silvereye, Golden finch, Quail, Native Robin and other (mostly introduced) species.

In early 2001 Mt Lyford Lodge was opened at the base of the access road with accommodation, restaurant and bar facilities. The lodge services the village and passing traffic on the Inland Road.

The 2016 Kaikoura earthquake had a major impact on the Mt Lyford alpine village and has meant some sections on the north-west side of the Mt Lyford Village may now have geotechnical issues, whereas the sections on the eastern side were untouched.

Mt Lyford was originally in Amuri County until the local government reforms in 1989 when it became the Hurunui District. 

Since Covid 19 the area has experienced a resurgence of interest, and a significant increase in property prices. Property prices had remained static since the village was developed in 1986, but have risen in recent times.

External links
http://www.mtlyford.co.nz/
http://www.alpinepacific.nz/

Lyford
Lyford